These are the results of the men's folding K-1 10000 metres competition in canoeing at the 1936 Summer Olympics. The K-1 event is raced by single-man canoe sprint folding kayaks and took place on Friday, August 7.

Thirteen canoeists from 13 nations competed. The 1936 Games was the only time when the folding K-1 10000 metres competition was part of the canoeing program.

Medalists

Final
Friday, August 7: Only a final was held.

References

1936 Summer Olympics Official Report Volume 2. p. 1026.
Sports reference.com 1936 K-1 10000 m folding results.

Men's folding K-1 10000